The Lecture of Emile Verhaeren is an oil on canvas painting by Belgian painter Théo van Rysselberghe. Painted 1903, it is currently house at the Museum of Fine Arts in Ghent.

Painting
The scene is set in an imaginary meeting in Emile Verhaeren's apartment in Saint-Cloud, wherein the poet is reading a passage from his own oeuvre. 

The audience, from left to right, includes Félix Le Dantec, Francis Vielé-Griffin, Félix Fénéon, Henri Ghéon, André Gide, Maurice Maeterlinck, and Henri-Edmond Cross.

The relatively modest furniture of the room emphasizes the intellectual and artistic character of the group, but without boasting their prominence. There is a completely filled bookcase on the bottom left (where the action starts); on the wall there hangs a painting by James Abbott McNeill Whistler, close friend of fellow Belgian painter Alfred Stevens, and even a statue by Georges Minne, sitting behind Fénéon, the only artist standing upright among the depicted group. Another filled bookcase appears at the other end of the painting, which is closed off by a curtain that partially covers its bookshelves.

Verhaeren is depicted on the far left, with his back turned to the viewer, and at first glance he may not seem to be the central object in the painting, nor its most important element. However, he is dressed in bright red (a color wherein he habitually dressed), which contrasts with the dull blue of the other group members' clothes. While all other artists, with similar looks on their faces, listen passively to Vethaeren, the latter is active, reading his poem out loud in his red clothes.

The inclination of Verharen's back is dynamic, his hand is expressive and plastic; it reaches to the center of the painting, and as a matter of fact it brings Verharen back to the center of the oil and of our attention. Verharen mouth is not visible, and it is as if his hand were talking for him. The whole dynamism of the painting stems for Verharen, with his peculiar position and hypotenusal, projecting raised hand. The energetic redness of his jacket further increases the dynamic role and position of the poet within the  painting.

Van Rysselberghe, therefore, expressed his admiration for Verhaeren in many ways in The Lecture of Emile Verhaeren. The poet's hand, moreover, has aristocratic character, with its fingers grouped in groups of two.

References

Sources
 
 

1903 paintings
Paintings by Théo van Rysselberghe
Pointillism
Post-impressionist paintings